The Tongling–Jiujiang railway or Tongjiu railway, is a single-track railroad in eastern China between Tongling in Anhui Province and Jiujiang in Jiangxi Province.
Major cities and towns along route include Tongling, Chizhou, Dongzhi County, Pengze, Hukou County and Jiujiang.

Line description
The line follows the southern bank of the Yangtze River from Tongling to Hukou and crosses Poyang Lake to Jiujiang.  The Tongjiu railway was built from May 2005 to March 2008.  Freight service began on July 1, 2008 and passenger service followed on September 1, 2008.

The Tongling–Jiujiang railway, together with the Nanjing–Tongling railway constructed earlier, form a rail line along the Yangtze's right bank, from Nanjing to Jiujiang. The new Nanjing–Anqing intercity railway follows the same general route from Nanjing to Chizhou, where it crosses the Yangtze to reach Anqing.

Rail connections
 Tongling: Nanjing–Tongling railway, Nanjing–Anqing intercity railway
 Chizhou: Nanjing–Anqing intercity railway
 Jiujiang: Hefei–Jiujiang railway, Wuhan–Jiujiang railway, Nanchang–Jiujiang intercity railway

See also

 List of railways in China

References

Railway lines in China
Rail transport in Anhui
Rail transport in Jiangxi
Jiujiang
Tongling
Railway lines opened in 2008